Lord Cathcart was launched at Hull in 1807. She was a West Indiaman but made one voyage to India, sailing under a licence from the British East India Company. She foundered in 1820 after striking a rock at Pelagosa Island in the Adriatic Sea.

Career
Lord Cathcart entered Lloyd's Register in 1808 with J. Lane, master, Foster & Co., owner, and trade Hull–Jamaica.

The Register of Shipping reports the following information:

In 1813 the EIC had lost its monopoly on the trade between India and Britain. British ships were then free to sail to India or the Indian Ocean under a licence from the EIC.

Fate
Captain J. Ferrand, the carpenter, and three seamen drowned. The Chief Officer and eleven of the crew reached Manfredonia after two days and nights in her boats.

Citations

References
 

1807 ships
Age of Sail merchant ships of England
Maritime incidents in January 1820